The Second Bettel–Schneider Ministry (also known as  Bettel–Schneider Ministry II or the Bettel–Schneider–Braz Ministry) is the current government of Luxembourg. It is led by Prime Minister Xavier Bettel and co-Deputy Prime Ministers Etienne Schneider and Félix Braz. It was formed on 5 December 2018, after the 2018 election which saw all 60 seats in the Chamber of Deputies renewed. The government is a continuation of the traffic light coalition between the Democratic Party (DP), the Luxembourg Socialist Workers' Party (LSAP) and The Greens from the First Bettel–Schneider Ministry, with minor changes.

Overview

References

External links 

 Official website

Government of Luxembourg
Ministries of Luxembourg
Cabinets established in 2018
Current governments